Nunburnholme railway station was a railway station on the York to Beverley Line in the East Riding of Yorkshire, England. It opened in 1848 as Burnby, and was renamed 1873. It closed in 1951.

History
Burnby railway station opened in 1848. It was renamed Nunburnholme on 1 January 1873.

The station served the villages of Nunburnholme and Burnby.

It closed on 31 March 1951.

References

Sources

 
 

Disused railway stations in the East Riding of Yorkshire
Former York and North Midland Railway stations
Railway stations in Great Britain opened in 1848
Railway stations in Great Britain closed in 1951
1847 establishments in England
George Townsend Andrews railway stations